Wayne is an unincorporated community in Republic County, Kansas, United States.  It is located northeast of Concordia along K-148 highway near Co Rd 22.

History
Wayne had its start in the year 1884 by the building of the railroad through that territory.

A post office was opened in Wayne in 1884, and remained in operation until it was discontinued in 1971.

Education
The community is served by Republic County USD 109 public school district.

References

Further reading

External links
 Republic County maps: Current, Historic, KDOT

Unincorporated communities in Republic County, Kansas
Unincorporated communities in Kansas